Loriguilla is a municipality in the comarca of Camp de Túria in the Valencian Community, Spain.

Notable people
 Montserrat Cervera Rodon (born 1949), elected mayor of Loriguilla, 2022

See also
Sierra de Utiel

References

Municipalities in Camp de Túria
Populated places in Camp de Túria